West Virginia Route 82 is an east–west state highway in central West Virginia, USA. The western terminus of the route is at an interchange with U.S. Route 19 in Birch River. The eastern terminus is at West Virginia Route 20 outside Cowen.

Course
From Cowen, the road travels past the Big Ditch Wildlife Management Area and through Boggs in Webster County until reaching the community of Birch River in Nicholas County.

With the exception of a small portion by Big Ditch Lake, the entire route follows the Birch River.

Major intersections

References

082
Transportation in Nicholas County, West Virginia
Transportation in Webster County, West Virginia